Heinrich Rombach (10 June 1923 in Freiburg im Breisgau – 5 February 2004 in Würzburg) was a German philosopher and professor of philosophy at the University of Würzburg. He is known for developing structural ontology.

Works 
 Über Ursprung und Wesen der Frage, Freiburg / München: Alber 1952, ²1988. 
 Substanz System Struktur: Die Ontologie des Funktionalismus und der philosophische Hintergrund der modernen Wissenschaft, 2 Bde., Freiburg / München: Alber 1965/66, ²1981. Studienausgabe 2010 mit dem Untertitel Die Hauptepochen der europäischen Geistesgeschichte, Band 1: , Band 2: 
 Strukturontologie: Eine Phänomenologie der Freiheit, Freiburg / München: Alber 1971, ²1988 
 Mutmaßungen über das Ende der Hochkulturen, in: Philosophisches Jahrbuch 82 (1975), S. 241–258
 Phänomenologie heute, in: Phänomenologie heute: Grundlagen- und Methodenprobleme (= Phänomenologische Forschungen Bd. 1), Freiburg / München: Alber 1975, S. 11–30
 Leben des Geistes: Ein Buch der Bilder zur Fundamentalgeschichte der Menschheit, Freiburg/Basel/Wien: Herder 1977. 
 Die Grundstruktur der menschlichen Kommunikation: Zur kritischen Phänomenologie des Verstehens und Missverstehens, in: Mensch, Welt, Verständigung: Perspektiven einer Phänomenologie der Kommunikation (= Phänomenologische Forschungen Bd. 4), Freiburg / München: Alber 1978, S. 19–51
 Phänomenologische Erziehungswissenschaft und Strukturpädagogik, in: Klaus Schaller (Hrsg.), Erziehungswissenschaft der Gegenwart: Prinzipien und Perspektiven moderner Pädagogik, Bochum 1979, S. 136–154
 Phänomenologie des gegenwärtigen Bewusstseins, Freiburg / München: Alber 1980. 
 Das Phänomen Phänomen, in: Neuere Entwicklungen des Phänomenbegriffs (= Phänomenologische Forschungen Bd. 9), Freiburg / München: Alber 1980, S. 7–32
 Welt und Gegenwelt: Umdenken Über die Wirklichkeit. Die philosophische Hermetik, Basel: Herder 1983
 Zur Hermetik des Daseins: Ein philosophischer Versuch, in: Karl-Ernst Bühler/Heinz Weiß (Hrsg.), Kommunikation und Perspektivität: Beiträge zur Anthropologie aus Medizin und Geisteswissenschaften. Festschrift für Dieter Wyss zum 60. Geburtstag, Würzburg 1985, S. 13–19
 Philosophische Zeitkritik heute: Der gegenwärtige Umbruch im Licht der Fundamentalgeschichte, in: Philosophisches Jahrbuch 92 (1985), S. 1–16 [auch in: Die Welt als lebendige Struktur, S. 123–142]
 Strukturanthropologie: „Der menschliche Mensch“, Freiburg / München: Alber 1987, ²1993, Studienausgabe 2012  
 Die sechs Schritte vom Einen zum Nicht-anderen, in: Philosophisches Jahrbuch 94 (1987), S. 225–245 [auch in: Die Welt als lebendige Struktur, S. 97–122]
 Die Gegenwart der Philosophie: Die Grundprobleme der abendländischen Philosophie und der gegenwärtige Stand des philosophischen Fragens, 3., grundlegend neu bearb. Aufl. Freiburg / München: Alber 1988. 3-495-47642-3
 Der kommende Gott: Hermetik – eine neue Weltsicht, Freiburg 1991
 Das Tao der Phänomenologie, in: Philosophisches Jahrbuch 98 (1991), S. 1–15 [auch in: Die Welt als lebendige Struktur, S. 51–70]
 Der Ursprung: Philosophie der Konkreativität von Mensch und Natur, Freiburg 1994
 Phänomenologie des sozialen Lebens: Grundzüge einer Phänomenologischen Soziologie, Freiburg / München: Alber 1994. 
 Drachenkampf: Der philosophische Hintergrund der blutigen Bürgerkriege, Freiburg 1996
 Die Welt als lebendige Struktur: Probleme und Lösungen der Strukturontologie, Freiburg 2003
 mit Kōichi Tsujimura und Ryosuke Ohashi: ‘‘Sein und Nichts. Grundbilder westlichen und östlichen Denkens. Basel / Freiburg / Wien: Herder 1981. 
 Hrsg.: Die Frage nach dem Menschen. Aufriß einer Philosophischen Anthropologie. Festschrift für Max Müller zum 60. Geburtstag. Freiburg / München: Alber 1966

See also
Georg Stenger
Polylog - Zeitschrift für interkulturelles Philosophieren
Intercultural relations
Cross-cultural communication

References

External links
 
 Georg Stenger zu Leben und wiss. Gesamtwerk von Heinrich Rombach (vormals: Portal von information-philosophie.de, jetzt dort nicht mehr verfügbar; PDF-Datei; 40 kB)
 Der Autor der Strukturontologie. Eine Phänomenologie der Freiheit (1971): Professor Dr. Heinrich Rombach – Links zum philosophischen Werk des Strukturphänomenologen mit Bibliographie (2003)

20th-century German philosophers
Continental philosophers
Philosophers of culture
Phenomenologists
Heidegger scholars
Academic staff of the University of Würzburg
1923 births
2004 deaths